is a prolific Japanese pianist and composer.

Nishimura studied at the Toho Gakuen School of Music. Her piano style is light easy listening, her works are sometimes heard on television in Japan, and she has a following in Hong Kong and China.

Discography
 Angelique (1986)
 Lyrisme (1987)
 Dolce (1988)
 Fascination (1988)
 Lumiere ～地図のない季節～ (1989) : playin' around with no map and plot
 L'espoir ～レスポワール～ (1989)
 風色の夢 (1990) : windings in Fantastic world
 Vi・Ji・N (1991) : sophisticated girl
 101回目のプロポーズ (1991) : ("The Hundredth Proposal of Marriage")
 MOON (1992)
 親愛なる者へ (1992)
 SUPER BEST (1992)
 プロポーズ ～Propose～ (1992)
 graceful (1993)
 GOOD MORNING ～グッドモーニング～ (1994)
 Memories (Released in Hong Kong only) (1995)
 時の輝き (1995)
 Virgin (1995)
 Blue Horizon (1996)
 月いろのつばさ (1997)
 大地のうた (1998)
 BALLISTIC KISS (1998)
 自分への手紙 (1999)
 風が生まれる瞬間 (2000)
 優しさの意味 (2001)
 しあわせまでもう少し (2002)
 明日のために (2002)
 扉をあけよう (2003)
 君が想い出になる前に (2004)
 しあわせのかたち (2004)
 耳をすまして (2005)
 Best of Best ～20 Songs～ (2006)
 あなたが輝くとき (2007)
 Vitamin (2009)
 Piano (2010)
 Smile Best ～selfcover collection～（2011/7）　
 Beautiful Morning（2011/7）（yccs10049）
 Bedtime Music（2011/7）（yccs10050）
 フレデリック・バック meets 西村由紀江 (2012)
 ビオトープ (2013)

References

External links
 Yukie Nishimura Official Website

1967 births
Japanese women pianists
Japanese composers
Japanese women composers
Japanese pianists
Living people
New-age pianists
People from Toyonaka, Osaka
Toho Gakuen School of Music alumni
21st-century Japanese pianists
21st-century Japanese women musicians
21st-century women pianists